Bill Cummings may refer to:

 Bill Cummings (racing driver) (1906–1939) winner of the 1937 Indianapolis 500
 Bill Cummings (philanthropist), American philanthropist
William Cummings (disambiguation)